Monte Cistella is a mountain roughly in the middle of the Lepontine Alps.

Description
It is wholly in Ossolan territory and comprises three main peaks: the horn (2780m), the Cistella peak (2880m) and pizzo Diei (2906m). It is unusual as a mountain as these three peaks are connected by large relatively flat plateaus at an altitude of over 2600m. They were probably smoothed out by large glaciers and the result is a highly individual mountain that is instantly recognisable (like the Matterhorn which is not far from it). It is the most symbolic mountain of the Ossola valley (not the tallest by far...Mount Rosa is at 4636m). But it is the most loved by the Ossolani, especially by the Vate dell'Ossola (maximum poet), Giovanni Leoni, who over one hundred years ago sang its praise. Ul Totorotela (Leoni's nickname) was one of the founders of the local Alpine Club as well as poet and traveller. He and his family had and still have a long connection with this mountain and over 100 years ago he campaigned to build a mountain hut, a shelter for keen alpinists that still bear his name.

SOIUSA classification 
According to SOIUSA (International Standardized Mountain Subdivision of the Alps) the mountain is classified in the following way:
main part = Western Alps
major sector = North-Western Alps
section = Lepontine Alps
subsection = Northwestern Lepontine Alps
supergroup = Catena Monte Leone-Blinnenhorn
group = Gruppo dello Helsenhorn
subgroup = Sottogruppo Cistella-Diei
code = I/B-10.I-A.2.b

References

Mountains of Piedmont
Mountains of the Alps
Two-thousanders of Italy
Lepontine Alps